Nosy Boraha , previously known as Sainte-Marie, main town Ambodifotatra, is an island off the east coast of Madagascar. The island forms an administrative district within Analanjirofo Region, and covers an area of 222 km2. 
It has a population estimated at 30,000.

Sainte-Marie Island is known for its authentic and preserved character, whale watching, beautiful beaches, and history.

Administration
The island is organized as the city (commune urbaine) and district of Nosy Boraha in Analanjirofo Region.
1 town hall
17 fokontany (villages)
1 deputy

Population
The Betsimisaraka are the largest ethnic group on the island, though there had been a long history of mixed marriages, including with pirates in the 17th century.

Transport infrastructure
1 international airport in the South (inaugurated 2015)
1 commercial port (Ilot Madame)
1 passenger port (Ambodifotatra)
Ferries leave from Soanierana Ivongo and Mahambo, but there are also boats from Toamasina.

Geography 

Whale watching 

The channel between Nosy Boraha and Madagascar is known for whale watching. Substantial pods of humpback whales (Megaptera) migrate from the Antarctic to the Baie de Tintingue, where the conditions are well suited for mating and raising calves before their annual migration to colder water. Although scarce, southern right whales as a part of the recolonization of their former ranges, are known to appear along the coast from time to time.

History

Golden age of Piracy 

Ile Sainte-Marie, or St. Mary's Island as it is known in English, became a popular base for pirates, between the 17th and 18th centuries. Beginning with Adam Baldridge in 1691 and ending with John Pro in 1719, the location was favourable for pirate activity, being near maritime routes travelled by ships returning from the East Indies, their holds overflowing with loot. The location also provided bays and inlets for protection from storms, abundant fruit and quiet waters. Legendary pirates including William Kidd, Robert Culliford, Olivier Levasseur, Henry Every, Abraham Samuel and Thomas Tew lived in the île aux Forbans, an island located in the bay of Sainte Marie's main town, Ambodifotatra. Many of them were interred in cemeteries on Nosy Boraha, although the remains have never been identified. 
The utopian pirate republic of Libertalia was also rumoured to exist in this area, although the republic's existence, let alone its location, has never been proven.

French Colonization 

In 1750, the ruler of the Kingdom of Betsimisaraka, Bety of Betsimisaraka, ceded the Island to the Kingdom of France in a Treaty. However, in 1752 the French Colonists were massacred when the local population rebelled. France left the settlement abandoned for roughly half a century until returning in 1818, when the island was converted into a Penal Colony.In 1857 the French established the first Catholic church in Madagascar, which is still in use today. French Rule came to an end in 1960 after the island's population voted in a referendum to join the Malagasy Republic.

Diving 
Free from sharks, the lagoon of the island is endowed with significant coralline growth. Its underwater fauna is conserved as a natural heritage and popular diving site in the Indian Ocean.

On 7 May 2015, a large  "silver" ingot, which was believed to be Captain Kidd's treasure, was found off the coast of the island.  After further analysis, UNESCO determined that the piece actually consisted of 95% lead; they judged it to be "a broken part of the Sainte-Marie port constructions."

Traditions 
On Nosy Boraha, the inhabitants are attached to traditions. The social or family events are faithfully linked to practices invoking the ancestors' spirits. The wealth and variety of these rituals underline the authenticity and depth of the "Saint-marien" cultural identity.

Fauna and flora 
The insular character and the coralline soil encouraged various adaptations, as much of animal as of plant structure. Thus, Boraha is endowed with a rich fauna and flora. There are several species of lemur as well as numerous orchid species, among which is the "Queen of Madagascar" (Eulophiella roempleriana). The island was home to the only known population of Delalande's coua, a species of cuckoo that became extinct in the late 19th century, possibly due to predation by feral cats.

Museums
Ilot Madame Museum is the only museum found on this island.

Popular Culture
Nosy Boraha is the setting for the fantasy historical children's book Kintana and the Captain's Curse by Susan Brownrigg. (Uclan Publishing, July 2021.)

Crime
Recent violent assaults have been reported on the island and it is not recommended to visit alone.

Gallery

See also
Bety of Betsimisaraka
Île aux Nattes

References

External links 

Office of Tourism of Sainte Marie

Sainte-Marie
Populated places in Analanjirofo
Pirate dens and locations
Piracy in the Indian Ocean